The men's 400 metre freestyle event at the 2001 World Aquatics Championships took place 22 July. Both the heats and final were held on 22 July.

In the final, Australian swimmer Ian Thorpe broke his own world record with a time of 3:40.17, bettering his previous record of 3:40.59 and successfully defending his world title. At the 200 metre mark in this race, Thorpe was over a second outside world record pace but had a split of 53.78 in the last 100 metres to break the record. This was the first of six gold medals he would win, and the first of four world records he would set at these championships.

Records
Prior to the competition, the existing world and championship records were as follows.

The following record was established during the competition:

Results

Final

Key: WR = World record

Preliminaries

Note: 37 swimmers were in the event.

References

External links
Results from swimrankings.net Retrieved 2010-01-21

Swimming at the 2001 World Aquatics Championships